Big Brother 1 or Big Brother (season 1) is the first season of various versions of Big Brother and may refer to:

 Big Brother (Albanian season 1), the 2008 Albanian edition of Big Brother
 Big Brother (Australian season 1), the 2001 Australian edition of Big Brother
 Big Brother (British series 1), the 2000 UK edition of Big Brother
 Big Brother (Croatian season 1), the 2004 Croatian edition of Big Brother
 Big Brother (Dutch season 1), the 1999 Dutch edition of Big Brother
 Big Brother (Finnish season 1), the 2005 edition of Big Brother in Finland
 Big Brother (German season 1), the 2000 German edition of Big Brother
 Big Brother (Greek season 1), the 2001 Greek edition of Big Brother
 Big Brother (Israeli season 1), the 2008 edition of Big Brother in Israel
 Big Brother (Serbian season 1), the 2006 edition of Big Brother in Serbia, Bosnia and Herzegovina, and Montenegro
 Big Brother (Slovenian season 1), the 2007 Slovenian edition of Big Brother
 Big Brother 1 (American season), the 2000 U.S. season of Big Brother
 Big Brother 1 (Bulgarian season), the 2004-2005 Bulgarian edition of Big Brother
 Big Brother 1 (Romania), the 2003 Romanian edition of Big Brother
 Big Brother 1 (Indonesia), the 2011 season of Big Brother in Indonesia
 Big Brother 1 (Ukraine), the 2011 edition of Big Brother in Ukraine
 Big Brother Africa (season 1), the 2003 African edition of Big Brother
 Big Brother Canada (season 1), the English-Canadian 2013 edition of Big Brother
 Big Brother Thailand (season 1), the 2005 Thai edition of Big Brother
 Big Brother Brasil 1, the 2002 Brazilian edition of Big Brother
 Pinoy Big Brother: Season 1, the 2005 edition of Big Brother in the Philippines

See also 
 Big Brother Angola: Tesouro, the 2014 Angolan edition of Big Brother
 Bigg Boss (Hindi season 1), the 2006-2007 edition of Big Brother in India
 Gran Hermano (Argentine season 1), the first 2001 Argentinian edition of Big Brother
 Gran Hermano (Spanish season 1), the 2000 edition of Big Brother in Spain
 Grande Fratello (season 1), the 2000 edition of Big Brother in Italy
 Loft Story (Canadian TV series)#Season 1, the French-Canadian 2003 edition of Big Brother
 Secret Story (French season 1), the 2007 edition of Big Brother in France
 Secret Story 1 (French season), the 2010 edition of Big Brother in Portugal
 Velký Bratr, the 2005 Czech edition of Big Brother